Pennebaker is a surname. Notable people with the surname include:

D. A. Pennebaker (1925–2019), American documentary filmmaker
James W. Pennebaker (born 1950), American social psychologist
John Pennebaker (1943–2016), American lawyer and politician